Champion is the second studio album by British musician Bishop Briggs. It was released on 8 November 2019 under Island Records. In support of the album, Briggs announced a tour across North American and Europe, with support acts Miya Folick and Jax Anderson.

The first single from the album, "Champion" was released on 17 July 2019. The second single "Tattooed on My Heart" was released on 24 July 2019. "Jekyll & Hide", the third single, was released on 14 October 2019.

Critical reception
Champion was met with generally favourable reviews from critics. At Metacritic, which assigns a weighted average rating out of 100 to reviews from mainstream publications, this release received an average score of 69, based on 4 reviews.

Accolades

Track listing

References

2019 albums
Bishop Briggs albums
Island Records albums